Alpena (pronounced al-PEE'-nuh) is a town in northeastern corner of Jerauld County, South Dakota, United States. The population was 286 at the 2010 census.

History
Alpena was platted in 1883, and most likely was named after Alpena, Michigan, the native home of the town's proprietor. A post office has been in operation at Alpena since 1883.

Geography

Alpena has been assigned the ZIP code 57312, and the FIPS place code 01020.

Demographics

2010 census
As of the census of 2010, there were 286 people, 110 households, and 73 families residing in the town. The racial makeup of the town was 86.7% White, 0.7% Native American, 1.0% Pacific Islander, 9.8% from other races, and 1.7% from two or more races. Hispanic or Latino of any race were 23.8% of the population.

There were 110 households, of which 30.9% had children under the age of 18 living with them, 53.6% were married couples living together, 8.2% had a female householder with no husband present, 4.5% had a male householder with no wife present, and 33.6% were non-families. 27.3% of all households were made up of individuals, and 8.2% had someone living alone who was 65 years of age or older. The average household size was 2.60 and the average family size was 3.18.

The median age in the town was 34.3 years. 26.2% of residents were under the age of 18; 5.6% were between the ages of 18 and 24; 27.9% were from 25 to 44; 24.8% were from 45 to 64; and 15.4% were 65 years of age or older. The gender makeup of the town was 51.0% male and 49.0% female.

2000 census
As of the census of 2000, there were 265 people, 113 households, and 78 families residing in the town. The population density was 161.1 people per square mile (62.0/km2). There were 122 housing units at an average density of 74.2 per square mile (28.5/km2). The racial makeup of the town was 99.62% White and 0.38% Asian. Hispanic or Latino of any race were 0.38% of the population.

There were 113 households, out of which 30.1% had children under the age of 18 living with them, 58.4% were married couples living together, 8.0% had a female householder with no husband present, and 30.1% were non-families. 28.3% of all households were made up of individuals, and 8.8% had someone living alone who was 65 years of age or older. The average household size was 2.35 and the average family size was 2.82.

In the town, the population was spread out, with 24.9% under the age of 18, 6.0% from 18 to 24, 23.0% from 25 to 44, 28.3% from 45 to 64, and 17.7% who were 65 years of age or older. The median age was 41 years. For every 100 females, there were 108.7 males. For every 100 females age 18 and over, there were 114.0 males.

The median income for a household in the town was $35,455, and the median income for a family was $38,000. Males had a median income of $25,625 versus $16,607 for females. The per capita income for the town was $13,533. About 10.4% of families and 14.4% of the population were below the poverty line, including 18.5% of those under the age of eighteen and none of those sixty five or over.

Media
The area is served by the True Dakotan weekly newspaper.

Notable person
 Al Neuharth, USA Today editor

See also
 List of towns in South Dakota

References

External links

 

Towns in Jerauld County, South Dakota
Towns in South Dakota
Populated places established in 1883
1883 establishments in Dakota Territory